Lives (also Romanized as Līves, Leyves, and Līyves) is a village in Seyyedvaliyeddin Rural District, Sardasht District, Dezful County, Khuzestan Province, Iran. At the 2006 census, its population was 202, in 41 families.

References 

Populated places in Dezful County